The following is a list of notable deaths in February 2004.

Entries for each day are listed alphabetically by surname. A typical entry lists information in the following sequence:
 Name, age, country of citizenship at birth, subsequent country of citizenship (if applicable), reason for notability, cause of death (if known), and reference.

February 2004

1
Art Albrecht, 82, American football player.
Buzz Gardner, 72, American trumpeter (The Mothers of Invention).
Valeri Gassy, 54, Ukrainian handball player, Olympic champion (1976).
Ally MacLeod, 72, Scottish football player and manager.
George Henry Speltz, 91, American Roman Catholic prelate.
Bob Stokoe, 73, English footballer, F.A. Cup winning manager.
James Edward Wood, 56, American murderer and self-confessed serial killer.

2
Alan Bullock, 89, British historian and author.
Henry Cockburn, 82, English footballer.
Róbert Zimonyi, 85, Hungarian Olympic rower.

3
Cornelius Bumpus, 58, American musician (The Doobie Brothers, Steely Dan).
Sam Fullbrook, 81, Australian artist.
John Popovich, 85, American professional football player (Card-Pitt, Pittsburgh Steelers) and college football coach (Waynesburg University).
Jason Raize, 28, American actor (The Lion King, Brother Bear).

4
Valentina Borok, 72, Soviet Ukrainian mathematician.
Ray Heaven, 85, English cricketer, heart attack.
Hilda Hilst, 73,  Brazilian poet, novelist, and playwright, complications from surgery and health conditions.
Michael P. Moran, 59, American actor (Scarface, Lean on Me, A Perfect Murder), Guillain–Barré syndrome.
Johnny Leartice Robinson, 51, American convicted murderer, execution by lethal injection.

5
Donald Barr, 82, American educator.
Sir Robert Boyd, 81, British space scientist.
Thomas Hinman Moorer, 91, American admiral, Chairman of the Joint Chiefs of Staff.
Frances Partridge, 103, British writer, last surviving member of the Bloomsbury Group.
Samuel M. Rubin, 85, American concessionaire and businessman, known for introducing popcorn to movie theaters in New York City in the 1930s.

6
Jerome F. Lederer, 101, American aviation safety pioneer.
Sir John Meyrick, 77, British rower and agriculturalist.
Humphry Osmond, 86, English psychiatrist and pioneer LSD experimenter.
Byron George Skelton, 98, American judge (United States Court of Appeals for the Federal Circuit, United States Court of Claims).

7
Richard Butler, 17th Viscount Mountgarret, 67, British soldier and aristocrat.
Safia Farhat, Tunisian artist, academic and women's rights activist.
Jože Šmit, 82, Slovene poet, translator, editor and journalist.
Norman Thelwell, 80, English cartoonist.

8
Walter Freud, 82, Austrian-born British World War II Special Operations agent and chemical engineer.
Cem Karaca, 58, Turkish singer and composer, heart attack.
Julius Schwartz, 88, American comic book and pulp magazine editor.

9
Robert F. Colesberry, 57, American film and television producer (After Hours, The Wire, Mississippi Burning), complications following cardiac surgery.
Michael Rowland, 40, American horse racing jockey.
Claude Ryan, 79, Canadian politician.

10
Nils Aas, 70, Norwegian sculptor and illustrator.
Paul Ilyinsky, 76, Three-time mayor of Palm Beach, Florida.
Edward Jablonski, 81, American biographer.
Hub Kittle, 86, American baseball player and manager, complications from kidney failure and diabetes.

11
Ryszard Kuklinski, 74, Polish-born colonel and spy.
Algernon Marsham, 84, English cricketer.
Tony Pope, 56, American voice actor (Metropolis, Spaced Invaders, Who Framed Roger Rabbit), complications following leg surgery.
Jim Robertson, 93, British army general.
Ralph Stewart, 74, Canadian member of Parliament (House of Commons representing Cochrane, Ontario).
Shirley Strickland, 78, Australian Olympic sprinter (winner of three gold, one silver and three bronze Olympic medals).
Hitoshi Takagi, 78, Japanese voice actor.

12
Martin Booth, 59, British author, brain tumour.
Robert A. Bruce, 87, American cardiologist.
Leonard Dudman, 70, Scottish sportsman.
Julius Elischer, 85, Hungarian-born Australian architect.
Martin Jurow, 92, American film producer (Breakfast at Tiffany's, The Pink Panther, The Great Race).
Sir John Killick, 84, British diplomat.
Preston Love, 83, American jazz saxophone player.

13
Denis Hurley, 89, South African Roman Catholic prelate, Archbishop of Durban (1946–1992).
Sir David Lee, 91, British Air Chief Marshal.
Ted Tappe, 73, American baseball player (Cincinnati Reds, Chicago Cubs).
Zelimkhan Yandarbiyev, 51, Chechen, political and military figurist, terrorist, President of CHRI (21 April 1996 - 26 January 1997), explosion.

14
Michael Brown, 88, British Anglican priest, Archdeacon of Nottingham.
Jock Butterfield, 72, New Zealand rugby player.
Sir James Hann, 71, British businessman.
Elois Jenssen, 81, American film and television costume designer.
Marco Pantani, 34, Italian racing cyclist, winner of Tour de France and Giro d'Italia in 1998,  acute cocaine poisoning.

15
Jens Evensen, 86, Norwegian minister, World Court judge.
Jan Miner, 86, American actress.
Lawrence Ritter, 81, American writer.

16
Don Cleverley, 94, New Zealand cricketer.
Charlie Fox, 82, American baseball manager.
Bill Oakley, 39, American comic book letterer (The League of Extraordinary Gentlemen, Batman: Gotham Knights, Daredevil), cancer.
Sir Harold Smedley, 83, British diplomat.
Doris Troy, 67, American R&B singer.

17
Bruce Beaver, 76, Australian poet and novelist.
Clark Byers, 88-89, American sign maker.
Gaston Godel, 89, Swiss Olympic race walker, silver medalist (1948).
José López Portillo, 83, Mexican politician and lawyer, President of Mexico.
Cameron Todd Willingham, 36, American convicted murderer, executed by lethal injection in Texas.

18
Steve Neal, 54, American journalist (Chicago Sun-Times) and historian.
Jean Rouch, 86, French filmmaker and ethnologist.
Ivor Stanbrook, 80, British Conservative party politician, barrister and Member of Parliament representing Orpington from 1970 to 1992.

19
Gurgen Margaryan, 25, Armenian Army officer, murdered.
Archibald Paton Thornton, 83, Canadian historian.
Renata Vanni, 94, Italian-born American film actress.

20
Fred Brown, 79, British virologist.
Kōyū Ohara, 69, Japanese film director.
Ted Paige, 73, British physicist and engineer.

21
John Charles, 72, Welsh football player.
Les Gray, 57, British singer (Mud), heart attack during cancer treatment.
Bart Howard, 88, American composer, "Fly Me To The Moon".
Dan Kiley, 91, American landscape architect.
Guido Molinari, 70, Canadian abstract artist.
Lyudmila Shishova, 63, Soviet Olympic fencer and fencing coach (1960 gold medal winner, 1964 silver medal winner in women's team foil).

22
Colin Eaborn, 80, British chemist.
Roque Máspoli, 86, Uruguayan goalkeeper.
David Neiman, 82, Russian-born American rabbi, archaeologist and theologian.
Azriel Rosenfeld, 73, American computer image analysis researcher.
Andy Seminick, 83, American baseball player, MLB catcher and last survivor of the 1950 Philadelphia Phillies' "Whiz Kids" that won the National League championship.

23
Vijay Anand, 71, Indian Bollywood filmmaker and brother of Dev Anand..
Carl Anderson, 58, American actor (Jesus Christ Superstar)), leukemia.
Neil Ardley, 66, British jazz composer.
Sikander Bakht, 85, Indian politician, Governor of Kerala.
Don Cornell, 84, American singer of the 1940s and 1950s, advanced emphysema and diabetes.
Douglas Scott Falconer, 90, British geneticist.
Carl Liscombe, 89, Canadian Detroit Red Wings hockey player in the 1940s.
Bob Marshall, 93, Australian billiards player.

24
Albert Axelrod, 83, American foil fencer.
William Coates, 92, American claimant supercentenarian.
Eva Hoffmann-Aleith, 93, German evangelical pastor, teacher and author.
John Randolph, 88, American actor (Serpico, Prizzi's Honor, You've Got Mail), Tony winner (1987).
A.C. Reed, 77, American saxophonist, cancer.
Alvino Rey, 95, American jazz guitarist and bandleader ("Deep in the Heart of Texas").

25
Waggoner Carr, 85, American politician, Speaker of the Texas House of Representatives and Attorney General of Texas.
Robert Devereux, 18th Viscount Hereford, 71, English peer and politician.
Jack Flavell, 74, English Test cricketer.
Wally Garard, 87, American football player.
Jacques Georges, 87, French football administrator, President of UEFA.
Donald Hings, 96, British-Canadian inventor.
Pe Khin, 91, Burmese diplomat.
Yuri Ozerov, 75, Soviet Olympic basketball player (two-time silver medal winner: 1952 men's basketball, 1956 men's basketball).
B. Nagi Reddy, 91, Indian movie producer.
John W. Russell, 67, British-American Thoroughbred racehorse trainer, known for training Susan's Girl who won national titles in 1972 and 1973.
Ahmed Sefrioui, Moroccan novelist.

26
Douglas Birks, 84, English cricketer, myeloma.
Shankarrao Chavan, 83, Indian politician, Chief Minister of Maharashtra.
Adolf Ehrnrooth, 99, Finnish general, war veteran.
Russell Hunter, 79, Scottish actor.
Jack Sperling, 81, American jazz drummer who performed in big bands and as a studio musician for movies and television.
Boris Trajkovski, 47, Macedonian politician, President of the Republic of Macedonia.
Ralph E. Winters, 94, Canadian film editor.

27
Yoshihiko Amino, 76, Japanese Marxist historian and intellectual, lung cancer.
Clarence Barber, 86, Canadian economist and academic.
Vernon Bell, 81, founder of British karate pioneer.
Paul Sweezy, 93, American Marxian economist and founding editor of the Monthly Review..

28
Daniel J. Boorstin, 89, American social historian.
M. G. Mukherjee, Indian cricket umpire.
Ruslan Gelayev, 39, Chechen general and separatist, politician, terrorist, blood loss.
Andres Nuiamäe, 21, Estonian soldier, first Estonian soldier to be killed in Iraq.
Nicholas Vivian, 6th Baron Vivian, 68, British soldier and aristocrat.

29
Alexander Beresch, 26, Ukrainian Olympic gymnast.
Jane Engelhard, 86, American philanthropist and wife of industrialist Charles W. Engelhard Jr.
Gordon Hawkins, 84, English-born Australian criminologist.
Jerome Lawrence, 88, American playwright and author.
Danny Ortiz, 27, Guatemalan football goalkeeper.
William Clarke Wescoe, 83, American pharmacologist and educator, Chancellor of the University of Kansas (1960–1969)

References 

2004-02
 02